The 1997 NBA playoffs was the postseason tournament of the National Basketball Association's 1996–97 season. The tournament concluded with the defending NBA champion and Eastern Conference champion Chicago Bulls defeating the Western Conference champion Utah Jazz 4 games to 2. This was the Bulls' second straight title, and fifth overall (They completed the 3-peat by beating Utah again in 1998). Michael Jordan was named NBA Finals MVP for the fifth time.

Overview
The Minnesota Timberwolves made their playoff debut after failing to win more than 30 games in their first 7 seasons. It was also the first of 7 straight years in which they made the playoffs only to lose in the first round. They were the last of the 1988/89 expansion four to make their playoff debut

All four 1988/89 expansion teams (Minnesota, Miami, Orlando and Charlotte) made the playoffs for the first time. This would happen again in 2001.

Both eighth seeds in the 1997 Playoffs, the Washington Bullets and the Los Angeles Clippers, broke long playoff droughts (Bullets eight years, Clippers only just three) with this season’s playoff appearances. (The Bullets' last playoff appearance was in 1988; the Clippers in 1993). Unfortunately for both teams, it would be a long time before they made the playoffs again; the renamed Wizards made their return in 2005; the Clippers in 2006). The Bullets qualified by defeating the Cleveland Cavaliers in a regular season finale that saw both teams fighting for the #8 seed.

This season was the first, and to date only, season since the ABA–NBA merger that none of the four former ABA teams (the San Antonio Spurs, the Denver Nuggets, the Indiana Pacers, and the New Jersey Nets) qualified for the playoffs. It was also one of only four times that the Spurs failed to make the playoffs since their admission to the NBA. The Spurs would not miss the playoffs again until 2020.

The Los Angeles Memorial Sports Arena hosted its final NBA playoff game in Game 3 of the Clippers–Jazz series. When the Clippers returned to the playoffs in 2006, they had moved to the Staples Center (Now Crypto.com Arena), their home since the 1999–2000 season. The Sports Arena remained active until its closure and demolition in 2016; the site is now Banc of California Stadium, home to MLS' Los Angeles FC.

Game 3 of the Bulls–Bullets series was the last playoff game ever played at the USAir Arena. They moved into a new arena in December of the next season. It was also the final game for the Washington Bullets. They changed their team name to the Wizards on May 15, making it the last time the team was officially named the "Bullets".

With their first round victory over the Orlando Magic, the Miami Heat won a playoff series for the first time in franchise history.

Game 4 of the Bulls–Hawks series was the last game ever played at the Omni Coliseum. The Hawks' home playoff games for 1998 and 1999 were played at the Georgia Dome while the Omni was demolished to make way for what is now State Farm Arena, which would open in September 1999.

The Miami Heat became the sixth team in NBA History to come back from a 3-1 series deficit with their conference semifinals win over the New York Knicks. Ironically, their run to the Eastern Conference Finals marked the farthest they had reached in the playoffs up to that point; they did not return until 2005, and won the NBA Finals in 2006. They would not beat the Knicks again in a playoff series until 2012.

This was the first Western Conference title for the Jazz in their 23-year history, with their series win against the Houston Rockets. After losing in the Western Conference Finals to the Jazz, the Rockets would not win a playoff series until 2009 and would not return to the Conference Finals until 2015.

Bracket

Playoff qualifying

Western Conference

Best record in conference
The Utah Jazz clinched the best record in the Western Conference, and had home court advantage throughout the Western Conference playoffs.

Clinched a playoff berth
The following teams clinched a playoff berth in the West:

 Utah Jazz (64-18, clinched Midwest division)
 Seattle SuperSonics (57-25, clinched Pacific division)
 Houston Rockets (57-25)
 Los Angeles Lakers (56-26)
 Portland Trail Blazers (49-33)
 Minnesota Timberwolves (40-42)
 Phoenix Suns (40-42)
 Los Angeles Clippers (36-46)

Eastern Conference

Best record in NBA
The Chicago Bulls clinched the best record in the NBA, and earned home court advantage throughout the entire playoffs.

Clinched a playoff berth
The following teams clinched a playoff berth in the East:

Chicago Bulls (69-13, clinched Central division)
Miami Heat (61-21, clinched Atlantic division)
New York Knicks (57-25)
Atlanta Hawks (56-26)
Detroit Pistons (54-28)
Charlotte Hornets (54-28)
Orlando Magic (45-37)
Washington Bullets (44-38)

Memorable moments
The 1997 NBA Playoffs featured numerous clutch shots and other moments.

April 30: Chicago Bulls vs. Washington Bullets, Game 3
Scottie Pippen made the series-winning dunk with 7.4 seconds left as the Bulls swept the Bullets 96–95 and advanced.

May 1: Seattle SuperSonics vs. Phoenix Suns, Game 4
With his team trailing 107–104 with 4.3 seconds left, Phoenix guard Rex Chapman took the inbounds pass, launched a 3-point shot while falling out of bounds, and made the shot to tie the game. The Sonics would however win in OT 122-115.

May 6: Chicago Bulls vs. Atlanta Hawks, Game 1
Scottie Pippen broke a 97-97 tie by making a 3-point shot with 43.9 seconds left. Neither team would score after that, and the Bulls beat Atlanta 100–97.

May 14: New York Knicks vs. Miami Heat, Game 5
A courtside brawl erupted when Heat forward P.J. Brown body-slammed Knicks guard Charlie Ward causing both teams' benches to clear. For the Knicks, Patrick Ewing, John Starks, Allan Houston and Larry Johnson left the bench. All of the players involved were suspended. The Knicks, under-manned by the suspensions, lost the series in 7 games to start the Heat-Knicks rivalry. This was the first time in history where a New York-based major league sports team lost a playoff series after securing a 3–1 series lead; this would later be repeated when the New York Yankees blew a 3–0 series lead against the Boston Red Sox in 2004 and when the New York Rangers blew a 3–1 series lead against the Washington Capitals in 2009.

May 25: Utah Jazz vs. Houston Rockets, Game 4
Eddie Johnson made a 3 as time expired to tie the Western Conference Finals at 2.

May 29: Utah Jazz vs. Houston Rockets, Game 6
John Stockton scored 25 points and Karl Malone scored 24. John Stockton capped off a spectacular 4th quarter performance by hitting a 3 as time expired to send Utah to the NBA Finals for the first time in franchise history.

June 1: Chicago Bulls vs. Utah Jazz, Game 1
With the game tied at 82 with 9.2 seconds left, Jazz forward Karl Malone missed two crucial free throws. Chicago regained possession and Michael Jordan hit a jumper as time expired for the Bulls to win 84–82.

June 13: Chicago Bulls vs. Utah Jazz, Game 6
With most NBC viewers thinking Jordan would take the last shot with the game tied at 86, he instead passed to Steve Kerr, who made a 17-foot shot with 5 seconds left. On the next play, Scottie Pippen stole Bryon Russell's inbound pass and rolled the ball to Toni Kukoč, who clinched the title with a dunk.

Notes
For the first time since 1992, a #5 seed did not beat their #4 seeded opponent in the first round.
This would be the last postseason until 2004 to feature teams with sub .500 records.
Until 2020, this is the most recent postseason where a Western Conference team (Minnesota, Phoenix, and the Los Angeles Clippers) qualified with a losing record.

First round

Eastern Conference first round

(1) Chicago Bulls vs. (8) Washington Bullets

This was the first playoff meeting between the Bulls and the Bullets/Wizards franchise.

(2) Miami Heat vs. (7) Orlando Magic

This was the first playoff meeting between the Heat and the Magic.

(3) New York Knicks vs. (6) Charlotte Hornets

This was the second playoff meeting between these two teams, with the Knicks winning the first meeting.

(4) Atlanta Hawks vs. (5) Detroit Pistons

This was the seventh playoff meeting between these two teams, with each team winning three series apiece.

Western Conference first round

(1) Utah Jazz vs. (8) Los Angeles Clippers

This was the second playoff meeting between these two teams, with the Jazz winning the first meeting.

(2) Seattle SuperSonics vs. (7) Phoenix Suns

This was the fourth playoff meeting between these two teams, with the Suns winning two of the first three meetings.

(3) Houston Rockets vs. (6) Minnesota Timberwolves

This was the first playoff meeting between the Rockets and the Timberwolves.

(4) Los Angeles Lakers vs. (5) Portland Trail Blazers

This was the seventh playoff meeting between these two teams, with the Lakers winning four of the first six meetings.

Conference semifinals

Eastern Conference semifinals

(1) Chicago Bulls vs. (4) Atlanta Hawks

Game 4 was Robert Parish's final NBA game.

This was the fourth playoff meeting between these two teams, with the Hawks winning two of the first three meetings.

(2) Miami Heat vs. (3) New York Knicks

Patrick Ewing blocked a last second three pointer to preserve the victory.

This game featured a fight between P. J. Brown and Charlie Ward, with John Starks, Larry Johnson, Patrick Ewing, and Allan Houston leaving the bench. Brown was suspended for the rest of the series; Ewing, Houston, and Ward were suspended for Game 6; Johnson and Starks were suspended for Game 7.

Miami becomes the 6th team in NBA history to come back from a 3–1 series deficit.

This was the first playoff meeting between the Heat and the Knicks.

Western Conference semifinals

(1) Utah Jazz vs. (4) Los Angeles Lakers

In Game 5, Kobe Bryant had an infamous rookie moment in which he airballed 4 jump shots from the end of regulation through the end of overtime.

This was the second playoff meeting between these two teams, with the Lakers winning the first meeting.

(2) Seattle SuperSonics vs. (3) Houston Rockets

Seattle and Houston individually tie their regular season records with 57 wins apiece. Although the Sonics won the Pacific division, the Rockets won the regular season series over the Sonics 3-1, and gained home-court advantage.

This was the sixth playoff meeting between these two teams, with the SuperSonics winning the first five meetings.

Conference finals

Eastern Conference finals

(1) Chicago Bulls vs. (2) Miami Heat

This was the third playoff meeting between these two teams, with the Bulls winning the first two meetings.

Western Conference finals

(1) Utah Jazz vs. (3) Houston Rockets

Eddie Johnson hits the game-winning 3-pointer to even the series.

John Stockton hits the series-winning 3-pointer.

This was the fourth playoff meeting between these two teams, with the Rockets winning two of the first three meetings.

NBA Finals: (E1) Chicago Bulls vs. (W1) Utah Jazz

Michael Jordan hit the game-winning shot at the buzzer.

Scottie Pippen tied a then-Finals record with 7 3-pointers.

John Stockton threw a full-court pass over Michael Jordan to Karl Malone to give Utah the lead for good.

(The Flu Game), Michael Jordan plays 44 minutes and scores 38 points despite being ill from food poisoning.

Steve Kerr hits the series-winner with 5 seconds left, then Scottie Pippen steals Bryon Russell's inbounds pass and rolls the ball to Toni Kukoč, who dunks it right before the buzzer to bring the Finals to a close.

This was the first NBA Finals meeting between the Bulls and the Jazz.

References

External links
Basketball-Reference.com's 1997 Playoffs section

National Basketball Association playoffs
Playoffs
Sports in Portland, Oregon

fi:NBA-kausi 1996–1997#Pudotuspelit